Stan Morris (1 October 1893 – 3 December 1948) was an Australian rules footballer who played in the Victorian Football League (VFL) between 1919 and 1922 for the Richmond Football Club.

References

Hogan P: The Tigers Of Old, Richmond FC, Melbourne 1996

External links

Richmond Football Club players
Richmond Football Club Premiership players
Hawthorn Football Club (VFA) players
Australian rules footballers from Victoria (Australia)
1893 births
1948 deaths
One-time VFL/AFL Premiership players